Princess Iman may refer to:

Princess Iman bint Hussein (born 1983), Jordanian royal, daughter of King Hussein and Queen Noor
Princess Iman Pahlavi (born 1993), Iranian royal, daughter of Crown Prince Reza Pahlavi and Yasmine Pahlavi
Princess Iman bint Abdullah (born 1996), Jordanian royal, daughter and second child of King Abdullah II and Queen Rania

simple:Princess Iman